WWIO may refer to:

 WWIO (AM), a radio station (1190 AM) licensed to St. Marys, Georgia, United States
 WWIO-FM, a radio station (88.9 FM) licensed to Brunswick, Georgia, United States